The Battle–Friedman House (also known as Battle House or Friedman Home) is an antebellum town home located in Tuscaloosa, Alabama.  The house was built in 1835 by Alfred Battle and his wife, Millicent Battle.  The house's grounds include the only remaining documented antebellum garden in the state. The house itself is noted for its vernacular use of monumental boxed columns.  The Battle family lived in the house until 1875, when the home was purchased by Bernard Friedman.  The Friedman family continued to reside in the house until Victor Hugo Friedman died in 1965, leaving the house to the city of Tuscaloosa.  The Tuscaloosa County Preservation Society currently maintains the house as a historic house museum. It was added to the National Register of Historic Places in 1972.

See also
National Register of Historic Places listings in Tuscaloosa County, Alabama

References

Further reading
"Tuscaloosa Scrapbook", Matt Clinton
Past Horizons The Tuscaloosa County Preservation Society
A Belle of the Fifties: Memoirs of Mrs. Clay of Alabama, Virginia Clay-Clopton

External links

The Battle-Friedman House at Tuscaloosa County Preservation Society website

National Register of Historic Places in Tuscaloosa County, Alabama
Houses completed in 1835
Federal architecture in Alabama
Greek Revival houses in Alabama
Historic house museums in Alabama
Houses on the National Register of Historic Places in Alabama
Museums in Tuscaloosa, Alabama
Houses in Tuscaloosa, Alabama